TimeBridge was a Web-based software application for coordinating and running meetings and collaborating online. TimeBridge's meeting management service works with large groups or one-on-one meetings across time zones and companies and integrates directly with Microsoft Outlook, Google Calendar and Apple iCal. TimeBridge also includes phone and Web conferencing options. TimeBridge also includes phone and Web conferencing options as well as SMS features and an iPhone application.

TimeBridge was founded in 2005 by Yori Nelken. The company is based in Berkeley, California and funded by Mayfield Fund and Norwest Venture Partners.

TimeBridge announced their availability on iPhone in Sep 2009.

TimeBridge was acquired by the online local business network MerchantCircle in Sept 2010.

On May 26, 2011, Reply! Inc. announced that it had entered into a definitive agreement to acquire MerchantCircle

In July 2019, TimeBridge was acquired by Calendar

Awards and recognition
In April 2008, TimeBridge was named one of PC World's "101 Fantastic Freebies".

In March 2009, TimeBridge was named a Finalist in the 2009 "Webware 100" Awards.

In July 2009, the company was named Global 250 Winner by AlwaysOn.

See also
 Microsoft Outlook
 Google Calendar
 Apple iCal

References

External links
 TechCrunch TimeBridge’s Collaborative Scheduler Goes Mobile, Now Supports iCal
 VentureBeat TimeBridge Launches Scheduling Tool
 PC World TimeBridge Inc.
 WebWorkerDaily TimeBridge Makes Scheduling Easy 
 LifeHacker TimeBridge Finds and Confirms Agreeable Meeting Times
 WebWorkerDaily Manage Meetings With Meet With Me From TimeBridge
 TimeBridge Official Website
 TimeBridge on CNET
Timebridge has shut down. 

Proprietary cross-platform software
Date-matching software